MotorStorm: Arctic Edge is the third game in the MotorStorm series of video games, developed by Bigbig Studios and published by Sony Computer Entertainment for the PlayStation Portable and PlayStation 2, which was released in 2009.

Gameplay

The game once again moves away from the desert environments of the original title and the lush island environment of the sequel and relocates itself to the harsh Arctic climate of Alaska on the edge of the Arctic Circle. Gameplay is similar to that of previous titles in the series such as Nitrous Boosts, environmental hazards and destructible environments. Vehicles have the ability to cool down the boost by driving through deep snow or under waterfalls, the same technique used for driving through the water in MotorStorm: Pacific Rift. Unlike the previous titles in the series, the game only features a maximum of ten racers in each race.

New hazards include avalanches, which can be triggered by vehicle explosion or blowing the vehicle's horn, which causes a large amount of snow to rumble down the track and will strike away opponents, including the player, no matter the vehicles' strengths. Icy bridges can also be dangerous for heavy vehicles. While small vehicles can get over ice bridges, heavier vehicles can cause them to disintegrate and break, making the short-cut impossible to cross.

There are differences between PlayStation Portable and PlayStation 2 edition of the game in order to make use of each systems specific capabilities. The PlayStation Portable version features a Photo Mode, custom soundtracks and online play which features 6-player online multiplayer. On the other hand, the PlayStation 2 version features a split-screen multiplayer mode like the one present in the previous game, MotorStorm: Pacific Rift. The Time Attack game mode features an online leaderboard listing lap times set in the PlayStation Portable version of the game due to the PlayStation 2 version's lack of online functionality, though the mode itself is available for both consoles.

Game modes
As with the previous MotorStorm title, the core game mode of MotorStorm: Arctic Edge is the Festival, where the player participates in over 100 events spanning across 8 tiers. These events include various race series called "Invitational".

The other gameplay mode of the game is known as the Wreckreation Mode, which consists of various game modes, such as:
 Free Play, is the classic racing mode in most racing games where players select a race type, a track, and so on, followed by vehicle selection.
 Time-Attack, is where players are timed as to how long they take to navigate through the curves and turns one lap at the time. Once the lap time is set, the ghost of the best recorded time by the player will appear on the course, though the player can instead opt to race against the ghost representing the time set by the developers.

Vehicles
MotorStorm: Arctic Edge features a total of 24 vehicles from 8 vehicle classes, most of which are specially designed to suit the Arctic climate: Bike, ATV, Snow Machine, Buggy, Rally Car, Snowplugger, Snow Cat and Big Rig. Each vehicle is fully customisable, with a vast number of cosmetic modifications, such as liveries, spoilers, exhaust, and sponsor stickers.

Tracks
MotorStorm: Arctic Edge features a total of 12 tracks, alongside the reverse variants of each track. Some tracks also include numerous hazards within.

Icy bridges are seen during races in each track, and these will pose as a hazard for drivers below. While small, lightweight vehicles can easily navigate through, larger and heavier vehicles can easily disintegrate the bridge upon crossing it, thus causing opponents behind to tumble down the track, and will either be wrecked or receive some damage and drive off, if one of the heavy vehicles drives through while the other one behind falls down as the bridge gives way. Another new hazard, known as the avalanche, can be triggered by blowing the vehicles' horns, or by explosions from vehicles. The avalanche will then strike away opponents caught along the way. The amount of snow also increases as racers drive up the mountain, which would cause the surface to become more slippery for vehicles.

Development
MotorStorm: Arctic Edge for the PlayStation Portable and PlayStation 2 was confirmed by Sony Computer Entertainment and was not developed by Evolution Studios who had previously developed the past two titles but instead by Bigbig Studios. Prior to that rumours of a PlayStation Portable edition of the previously PlayStation 3 MotorStorm had been swirling due to a tip by a staff member of Sony Computer Entertainment Europe in November 2008.

Reception

The game was met with positive reception.  It has a score of 81% and 79 out of 100 for the PSP version, and 78% and 72 out of 100 for the PlayStation 2 version according to GameRankings and Metacritic.

References

External links
 
 Official MotorStorm: Arctic Edge website

2009 video games
PlayStation 2 games
PlayStation Portable games
Sony Interactive Entertainment games
MotorStorm
Video games developed in the United Kingdom
Multiplayer and single-player video games
Virtuos games